Chom Thong is one of the 50 districts (khet) of Bangkok, Thailand. The district is bounded by the districts (clockwise from north) Phasi Charoen, Thon Buri, Rat Burana, Thung Khru, Bang Khun Thian, and Bang Bon.

History
Chom Thong was part of Bang Khun Thien District until an announcement on 9 November 1989. On 14 October 1997, parts of Bang Pakok sub-district of Rat Burana and parts of Bukkhalo Sub-district of Thon Buri were transferred to Chom Thong during the administrative reform which rearranged the 38 Bangkok districts into 50 districts.

Economy
The district, together with Thung Khru, is well known for its tangerines, the Bang Mot tangerine. There is a giant tangerine sculpture at the junction between Rama II Road and Suk Sawat Road. The district is also the home of the Poomjai Garden lychee farm, Bangkok's last lychee plantation.

Administration
The district is sub-divided into four sub-districts (khwaeng).

Places

 Wat Rajorasaram (วัดราชโอรสาราม), originally called Wat Chom Thong, dates back to the Ayutthaya Kingdom. It was named when it became the royal temple of King Nangklao. The temple is unique because of the blending of Chinese architectural style with a Thai Buddhist temple.
 Wat Sai (วัดไทร) is a temple from the Ayutthaya Kingdom. It  belongs to the Mahayana branch of Buddhism. The nearby Wat Sai floating market was once a busy and lively floating market where farmers came and sold products on boat. The original market disappeared around 1977.
 Wat Nangnong Worawihan (วัดนางนองวรวิหาร), from the Ayutthaya Kingdom, was renovated by King Nangklao. Among the highlights include mother-of-pearl inlaid ubosot panels and the mixed of Thai, Chinese, and European-style in its design.

Transportation
 The district is served by Bangkok Skytrain Wutthakat Station  at the Chom Thong and Thon Buri District boundary.

References

External links
 BMA website with the tourist landmarks of Chom Thong
 Chom Thong district office (Thai only)

 
Districts of Bangkok